The Inland Kaikōura Road, formerly designated State Highway 70, is a provincial highway in the South Island of New Zealand that runs from just south of Kaikōura to just north of Culverden via Waiau and Rotherham. White shields are used to signify this highway. It forms part of the Alpine Pacific Triangle tourist route. It also serves as an alternative inland route in cases where SH 1 is closed near the South Kaikōura Coast. Following the 14 November 2016 Kaikōura earthquake, all roads into Kaikōura were closed including SH70; after extensive regrading and clearance the Inland Road was the first road connection to Kaikōura to reopen and was a lifeline for the community.

History

The highway lost its state highway status because of the lack of traffic using it. In 1991 the section from Waiau to Kaikōura was revoked. The remainder of SH 70 was revoked in 2004. Because of its scenic qualities it is now noted as one of the must drive roads in New Zealand. The road in parts is narrow and winds through steep hill country with several river valleys.

The road was closed following the 2016 Kaikōura earthquake and was for a few days open to the military only; the first army convoy reached Kaikōura on Friday, 18 November 2016, and this was the only land route into Kaikōura since SH1 was cut off by the earthquake. Some time later, registered convoys were allowed. Unrestricted access was restored on 19 December 2016, giving the public road access to Kaikōura again.

Route
The highway runs inland on the Inland Kaikōura Road from SH 1 just south of Kaikōura. It then turns south west running almost parallel to SH 1 in an adjacent valley. Passing over the Conway River the road becomes the Inland Road. It continues south, eventually passing the intersection with Mt Lyford Forrest Drive (for access to Mt Lyford Alpine Village and Ski Area) and going through the small townships of Waiau (petrol available here) and Rotherham before ending at Red Post, the junction of Rotherham Point Road and SH 7's Mouse Point Road just north of Culverden.

Major intersections

See also
List of New Zealand state highways

References

Roads in New Zealand
Transport in Canterbury, New Zealand